"Creepin" is a song by American record producer Metro Boomin, Canadian singer the Weeknd, and Atlanta-based rapper 21 Savage. It was sent to rhythmic contemporary and contemporary hit radio through Republic Records and Boominati Worldwide as the lead single from Metro's second studio album, Heroes & Villains, on December 13, 2022. It is a partial cover of "I Don't Wanna Know" (2004) by Mario Winans featuring Enya and P. Diddy, which itself is based on a sample of "Ready or Not" by Fugees, which samples the synthesizer riff from Enya's song "Boadicea". The song also includes background vocals from Winans from the sample, as well as Travis Scott, who is a frequent collaborator of all three artists. Diddy himself would join the artists on a remix of the song on March 17, 2023.

Background and release
The Weeknd and Mario Winans had previously collaborated on the title track of the former's fourth studio album, After Hours (2020), which Winans co-wrote and co-produced. The Weeknd gave a shoutout to Winans on Instagram after the release of "Creepin" and Winans also congratulated Metro on the release of its parent album, Heroes & Villains. Upon release, the track instantly proved to be the most commercially-successful track on the album.

Critical reception
Brady Brickner-Wood of Pitchfork pointed out the track as a prime example for Metro's ability to think outside the box "without sacrificing the foundation of what makes his music so appealing in the first place". Jason Lipshutz at Billboard called the song a standout track on the album due to Metro engaging "in some rollicking genre exercises" and "joyfully" re-creating "I Don't Wanna Know".

Track listing
CD single
 "Creepin'" (Remix)
 "Creepin'"
 "Creepin'" (Instrumental)

Charts

Certifications

Release history

References

2022 songs
Metro Boomin songs
The Weeknd songs
21 Savage songs
Song recordings produced by Metro Boomin
Songs written by Metro Boomin
Songs written by 21 Savage
Songs written by the Weeknd
Songs written by DaHeala
Songs written by Mario Winans
Republic Records singles
Canadian Hot 100 number-one singles
Number-one singles in Greece
Number-one singles in Russia
Number-one singles in Singapore
Sean Combs songs